The 2017 African Women's Junior Handball Championship was the 24th edition of the championship organised by the Ivory Coast Handball Federation under the auspices of the African Handball Confederation. It was held in Palais des Sports de Treichville, Abidjan (Ivory Coast) from 4 to 10 September 2017. It was played in under-19 years category. It was the fifth time that Ivory Coast staged the competition. It also acts as qualification tournament for the IHF Women's Junior World Handball Championship. Top three teams i.e. Angola, Egypt and the hosts Ivory Coast qualified for the 2018 Women's Junior World Handball Championship to be held in Hungary.

Participating Teams
 
  (Defending Champion)
 
 
 
  (Host)

Round-robin
All teams played in a round robin system.

Match results
All times are local (UTC+0).

Day 1 

Day 2 

Day 3 

Day 4 

Day 5 

Day 6

Day 7

Awards

See also
 2016 African Women's Handball Championship
 2017 African Women's Youth Handball Championship

References

External links
 Tournament page on the African Handball Confederation official website

2017 in African handball
2017 in women's handball
2017 African Women's Junior Handball Championship
International handball competitions hosted by Ivory Coast
Junior
September 2017 sports events in Africa